Fotki is a digital photo sharing, video sharing and media social network website and web service suite; it is one of the world's largest social networking sites.
Fotki licenses photo-sharing software for many global companies, such as Telecom Italia, Alice.it, Sears, Mark Travel, Vegas.com, Funjet.com etc.

As of January 2011, Fotki claims to have over 1 million 600 thousand registered members from 241 countries and hosts over a billion digital images. It ranks in the 1400s in popularity by Alexa.

History
Fotki was founded in 1997 by Dmitri Don (current President) and his Katrin Lilleoks to store and share photos and communicate with others around the world. The name is derived from colloquial terms for photography in several Slavic languages. 

In 2001, the commercial version was launched. Since 2003, Fotki is a registered trade mark in the USA.

In June, 2007, Fotki.com was recognized by CNET as one of the best Web 2.0 applications.

In June 2012 paid members with 5-year unlimited storage accounts received message that they no longer have access to the original images unless they paid extra fees.

In August 2015, all free members received a message to upgrade to a paid service. Fotki stated they could no longer support free members since they were doing away with ads. On October 1, 2015 all free members accounts were deleted. 

In Jun 2018 email from fotki.com to one of the members stated "In order to keep quality of our service we remove old unused accounts. We've noticed that you didn't use your account at fotki.com for a year. That's why your account is queued to be deleted in 2 days". There is no option to reactivate account without paying for the service.

Features

Sharing

The primary purpose of the site is to allow and facilitate the process of sharing digital photos online. To that end, users can transfer an image file from a local device to Fotki's server using a variety of tools, where the file can be stored and downloaded by other users.

Storage
Owners of Premium, Trial and Free Unlimited accounts get unlimited storage space. Free accounts have a space limit of 3000 MB plus the option to get an additional 200 MB every month.

Organization
Fotki users can organize their photos and videos into a structure by grouping albums into folders, creating sub-folders, moving albums between folders, moving sub-folders between folders, moving and copying photos/videos between albums. Photos, albums and folders can be rearranged.

Users are also encouraged to add tags to their photos so they can be found in search.

Management Tools
When logged in, Fotki users have access to management tools which allow editing, moving or deleting their content, changing properties of the content, changing account settings and restricting access to the content if needed.

Access
By default, all content created in the "Public Home" is available to all viewers. No registration is required to access the public content. To restrict access to their content, Fotki users can use several security options, such as passwords for albums and folders, hidden albums, private section, shared folders, protection from right-click copying, restriction to view originals and to order prints. Fotki also allows for XML-based RSS and Atom feeds, as well as external linking and sending invites to view content.

Customization Options
Users can customize the look of their Fotki site by using different pre-designed skins or manually selecting colors for each element on their page.

Community Features
The site offers both member search and photo search. Members can be searched by name, profile type, location, gender, age, interest, marital status and more. IPTC keyword searching is supported.

Each Fotki member gets an e-mail account. Fotki e-mail system features a spam filter with 20 levels of sensitivity, address book and the ability to create custom folders to organize messages. Each member has a Guestbook which can be enabled or disabled. Guestbook messages can be public or private. Each individual photo can be commented. Members can create any number of personal blogs and forums.

Fotki runs photo contests on a regular basis. Participation is open to all registered members. Usually, first 3 winners receive a one-year Premium membership, but sometimes there may be other prizes involved if the contest is sponsored by a third party. Effective May 11, 2007, Fotki runs a weekly "My Photo Of The Week" contest.

Printing
Fotki.com offers printing services which include (as of April, 2010) digital photo prints, postcards, photo mugs, T-shirts, magnets, mouse-pads and photo frames at competitive prices.

Professional Services
Professional photographers can sell their photos at their own price, higher than the printing cost imposed by Fotki. The difference in price minus 15% commission fee goes to the photographer. Earned money is remitted by PayPal, check or bank transfer. Photographers who offer their photos for sale can upload small size, low-res or watermarked images to avoid theft. When such photo is requested, the photographer has the option to securely upload the full size image for printing.

Video sharing

Fotki offers a unique video hosting service, which allows uploading and storing videos and photos together in one album.
To activate this service, members must deposit  to their balance. Video streaming is ads free for everybody.

Fotki members can also store links to videos hosted by other websites. Video collections are displayed as a list of embedded previews which will enlarge when clicked on. To be accepted, the video has to be stored on Google Video, YouTube, Metacafe, Vsocial, MySpace, Vimeo, or Dailymotion.

Privacy And Security
Each account has a private and public area. Private areas are visible only to the account owner. Users can set viewing options to allow certain categories of people to view their albums (everybody, Fotki members only, Fotki friends only, or just the owner). Albums can be hidden or password protected or both.

Adult content can be marked with a "viewers discretion advised" flag. Such content requires age confirmation to be viewed. The site's Terms Of Service policy prohibits public display of adult content. Users can report photos in question using a complaint form. Copyright infringement is also prohibited.

Users can view IPs of people who write comments and guestbook messages on their site. Login names of visitors to a member's personal site are logged and stored in the member's "Guests" section. These options can be turned off.

All sensitive, personal and financial information is transmitted using SSL encryption (https). Personal information including email is not available to the public.

Localization
As of January 2011, the site is partially translated to Russian, German, French, Spanish, Italian, Chinese Simplified, Japanese, Polish, Dutch, Turkish, Brazilian Portuguese, Estonian, Icelandic, Latvian, Lithuanian, Malay, Ukrainian and Hebrew. With the help from volunteers, Fotki continues to translate its pages and improve the existing translation. Volunteers are rewarded with Premium memberships for contributing to the project.

Criticism
Fotki has been mostly criticized for not providing enough storage space to its Free members, problems with hotlinking, no month-to-month membership, and traffic limit. In addition, Fotki show ads on albums of paid Premium members.

Controversies and Discussions

Censorship and Artistic Nudity
In May 2006, a photo of a nearly-nude female was removed from a Fotki contest by the moderators. This initiated a prolonged discussion on "artistic nudity". The author of the disqualified entry criticized Fotki for censorship and questioned its policy on nudity. After exchanging arguments, the Fotki side agreed to review the site's policy in favor of artistic photography while the decision to prohibit adult content in public sections of the site was upheld. As a result, the Fotki administration decided to run a separate, non-public photo contest once a month in which nudity is allowed.

Contest Rules
In October 2006, several Fotki members posted messages in the Fotki blog protesting against the then-current contest rules which apparently allowed the earlier entrants to receive more exposure and thus get more votes. Other major issues brought up by the users included maintaining anonymity of entries while voting is in progress, allowing non-paying members to participate, working out a better formula for calculating the scores, allowing image editing and enhancement. A heated discussion that involved many Fotki members quickly gave rise to a vigorous campaign to make the administration change the contest rules. As a result, a new contest system was introduced and new rules developed.

Updated Storage Policy

Fotki sent out a message in June 2012 to all of its subscribers, notifying them of its financial situation and the resulting need for extra support for the storage of the original full-sized images. Access to the original images was suspended until further arrangements were made. 

In August 2015, all free members received a message to upgrade to a paid service. Fotki stated they could no longer support free members since they were doing away with ads and on October 1, 2015 all free members accounts would be deleted. All free members had to upgrade to a paid service or face their accounts to be deleted on October 1, 2015.

See also
 Image hosting service
 Photo sharing

References

External links
 Fotki website

Photography websites
Social networking websites
Image-sharing websites